The following table summarizes the all-time record for the Timor-Leste men's national football team. Timor-Leste has played matches against 16 current and former national teams, with the latest result, a loss, coming against Philippines on July 16, 2022.

Individual records

Player records

Players in bold are still active with Timor-Leste.

Most capped players

Top goalscorers

Most capped goalkeepers

note: 1. The above list pointed to a player who made his debut before they are even 18 years old.

See also
Timor-Leste national football team results

References

External links
 Timor-Leste National football team results

Record
National association football team records and statistics